The Vall d'Hebron University Hospital is a public and university affiliated hospital founded in 1955. It belongs to the Catalan Health Institute and is the hospital complex with the highest volume of interventions in Catalonia, Spain. It is located at the bottom of Collserola, at the north of Barcelona, and its influence area includes the districts of Horta-Guinardó, Nou Barris and Sant Andreu.

In actuality, it is the most important hospital complex in Catalonia. A study from 2009 places the Vall d'Hebron University Hospital among the four most important reference centers in Spain, and one of the twenty most important hospitals in the country.

The hospital complex is divided into three separate areas: the general hospital, the maternity hospital, and the orthopedics and rehabilitation hospital. It also has an outpatient surgical unit at Parc Sanitari Pere Virgili.

It currently employs over 7.000 professionals and has an annual budget of 580 million euros (2012). The hospital has 1.146 beds (182 reserved for critical patients), 45 operating rooms, 381 outpatient offices, and 3 emergency departments.

References

Hospitals in Barcelona
Teaching hospitals in Spain
Hospitals established in 1955
1955 establishments in Spain